Eva Maria Granados Galiano (born 6 January 1975) is a Spanish Catalan socialist and trade unionist politician, deputy of the Parliament of Catalonia since 2010 for the PSC.

Biography 
She has studied Political Science and Administration at the University of Barcelona, a Master in Public Management at ESADE and is an expert in the labor market and social dialogue at the Complutense University of Madrid in collaboration with the Julián Besteiro School of UGT. She has been linked to the University of Barcelona in the field of research and Human Rights and to information and encouragement of young people in the Student Information and Services Center of Catalonia (CISEC).

She is a member of the patronage of the Rafael Campalans Foundation, dedicated to the dissemination of democratic socialist thought.

Political career 
He has belonged to the Association of Young Students of Catalonia (AJEC). Granados is part of  the Party of the Socialists of Catalonia since 1999 in the Group of Pallejà in the Federation of the Baix Llobregat.

Affiliated in the General Union of Workers of Catalonia, she has been a member of the National Secretariat of the UGT from 2002 to 2010. She has represented UGT as a counselor and vice-president of the Economic and Social Work Council of Catalonia, in the Occupation Service of Catalonia, Industrial Pact of the Metropolitan Region of Barcelona and the Strategic Metropolitan Plan of Barcelona. He has also been a member of the Economic and Social Council of Spain, the Public Employment Service of the State and the Council of the European Social Fund.

In November 2010, she was elected deputy of the Parliament of Catalonia for the seat of Barcelona, which she revalidated in November 2012. She has been deputy spokesperson for the socialist group in the Catalan parliament and from January 2013 to August 2015, date of dissolution of the X legislature and spokesperson for the Commission for Social Welfare, Family and Immigration of its parliamentary group.

Since December 2011 she has been a member of the PSC executive, first led by Pere Navarro and since June 2014 by Miquel Iceta, where she is responsible for Social Cohesion.

In March 2015, she was part of the Promoting Commission of the Popular Legislative Initiative for Guaranteed Citizenship Income, supported by personalities from the cultural sphere and more than 50 social, civic and political entities to demand from the Catalan government the processing of a proposal of law on this subject carried out by way of urgency.

In July 2015 it was announced that she would occupy the number of 2 on the PSC list that Miquel Iceta will head to the regional elections on 27 September. She occupied the same place in the lists for the regional elections of 21 December 2017 after the dissolution of the Parliament in application of article 155 of the Spanish Constitution.

References

1975 births
21st-century Spanish women politicians
Complutense University of Madrid alumni
ESADE alumni
Living people
Members of the 9th Parliament of Catalonia
Members of the 10th Parliament of Catalonia
Members of the 11th Parliament of Catalonia
Members of the 12th Parliament of Catalonia
People from Barcelona
Spanish socialist feminists
Socialists' Party of Catalonia politicians
Spanish feminists
Spanish Socialist Workers' Party politicians
Spanish trade unionists
University of Barcelona alumni
Women members of the Parliament of Catalonia